Walter Granger may refer to:

Walter K. Granger (1888–1978), American politician
Walter W. Granger (1872–1941), American vertebrate palaeontologist